Shelley's sparrow (Passer shelleyi), also known as Shelley's rufous sparrow or the White Nile rufous sparrow, is a sparrow found in eastern Africa from South Sudan, southern Ethiopia, and north-western Somalia to northern Uganda and north-western Kenya. Formerly, it was considered as a subspecies of the Kenya sparrow. This species is named after English geologist and ornithologist George Ernest Shelley.

References

Works cited

External links 
White Nile rufous sparrow at the Internet Bird Collection

Passer
Birds of East Africa
Birds described in 1891